Frank Villenueve Nicholson (15 October 1878 – c. 1970) was an Australian Boer War veteran and rugby union player, a state and national representative who made two test appearances in 1903–1904, captaining the side on one occasion.

Early life
Nicholson was born in Villeneuve, Queensland, a place renamed from Humberstone by his father (also named Frank) who started the first sawmill in the area in 1877, founding the small town.

Career
Nicholson, a prop, played thirteen times for Queensland between 1900 and 1904 with twelve of these matches played against New South Wales. The Howell reference claims that Nicholson's rugby career was interrupted by enlistment in the Boer War. He claimed two international rugby caps for Australia. He appeared for Queensland against the touring New Zealanders in Brisbane in August 1903 and two weeks later made his international debut against the same tourists in Sydney, on 15 August 1903.

In 1904, he captained Queensland in the inter-state series and played alongside his brother Fred who scored a try in that match. Later that season he had the honour of captaining Australia in a Test match against a touring British Lions side. Australia lost the match 17–0. Nicholson was selected in a 1905 squad that toured New Zealand but he did not play in any matches of the tour.

He left Australia in 1905 going to Philadelphia to study dentistry. In 1906, he reintroduced Rugby per Rugby Union code to University of Pennsylvania while attending University of Pennsylvania School of Dental Medicine (Class of 1910).

Upon his return in 1911 he became a selector and coach of the Queensland state side.

Bibliography
 Howell, Max (2005) Born to Lead - Wallaby Test Captains, Celebrity Books, Auckland NZ

References

Australian rugby union players
Australian rugby union captains
Australia international rugby union players
1878 births
Year of death missing
Rugby union players from Queensland
Rugby union props